Ekaterina Lopes (née Ivanova; born 18 December 1987) is a Russian former tennis player.

Her highest WTA rankings are 136 in singles, which she reached in June 2009, and 142 in doubles, set in January 2012. Her strongest showing in a tour event was reaching the quarterfinal of the Barcelona Ladies Open in 2008 as a qualifier.

On 18 October 2011, at the Kremlin Cup, Lopes defeated world No. 13, Jelena Janković, 6–4, 1–6, 6–4.

ITF finals

Singles: 10 (5 titles, 5 runner-ups)

Doubles: 24 (11 titles, 13 runner-ups)

External links
 
 

1987 births
Living people
Tennis players from Moscow
Russian female tennis players
20th-century Russian women
21st-century Russian women